SM U-15 was one of the three Type U 13 gasoline-powered U-boats produced by the German Empire for the Imperial German Navy. On 9 August 1914, U-15 became the first U-boat loss to an enemy warship after it was rammed by British light cruiser .

Constructed by Kaiserliche Werft Danzig, U-15 was ordered on 23 February 1909 and was commissioned three years later on 7 July 1912. The boat left port for its first patrol on 1 August 1914, but on 9 August, U-15 was forced to lie stopped on the surface off the coast of Fair Isle, in Shetland, Scotland, after its engines had failed.

While stranded on the surface, the British warship  spotted the boat through a thick fog and could hear hammering from inside the boat as the crew tried to repair the damaged engines. The Birmingham'''s Captain Arthur Duff ordered his crew to fire on the U-boat, but missed. As U-15 attempted to dive to avoid the attack, Duff ordered for his ship to ram the submarine at full speed, cutting it in half and killing all 23 members of its crew.

References

Notes

Citations

Bibliography

Eberhard Möller and Werner Brack, The Encyclopedia of U-Boats From 1904 to the Present'', Greenhill Books, London, 2004. .

Type U 13 submarines
U-boats commissioned in 1912
Maritime incidents in August 1914
U-boats sunk in 1914
World War I submarines of Germany
World War I shipwrecks in the Atlantic Ocean
1911 ships
U-boats sunk by British warships
Ships lost with all hands
U-boats sunk in collisions
Shipwrecks of Scotland
1914 in Scotland
Fair Isle
History of Shetland